Offshoring as a service (OaaS) is a business model in which the offshore office is not owned by the entity itself, instead it is outsourced to a vendor. The concept of offshoring is not new; however, in the past, some companies have tried to open their own offshore offices. The OaaS model leans towards utilizing a team or company which specializes in offshoring work and uses them on a contractual basis as a part of their own team.

Benefits 
Offshoring provides several benefits to medium and small scale businesses by reducing operational costs and providing capability to sustain downturns in economic cycles.

It is crucial for companies to either invest in a robust management structure in offshore or find a trusted partner to effectively leverage offshore teams. 
Offshoring provides several benefits, for example:
 Reduced operational costs providing capability to sustain downturns in economic cycles.  
 Access to a bigger talent pool.
 24 hours operational opportunity.
 Increased productivity with extended working hours (onshore and offshore handoff).
 Increased flexibility.
 Economies of scale.
 Diversity and access to a team that has a broader and longer view of the world.

Challenges
Offshoring can have its own challenges like communication and cultural issues, high turnover rate, lack of effective management, physical proximity, etc.  
It is crucial for companies to either invest in a robust management structure in offshore or find a trusted partner to effectively leverage offshore teams.  
Choose a company that:
 provides end-to-end services
 has a strong management team with broad experience working in startups and understands the unique challenges of startups
 agrees to proactive communication and state of the art delivery management methodologies
 is not just an offshore shop but has presence in the US (or wherever the company is based and wants to offshore from) as well
 has an offshore team that also travels frequently to US (or wherever you are based and want to offshore from)
 has a team that has studied, worked and lived in US and Europe
 has a technology and management team that has experience in offshoring

References

Business models
Offshoring